Qulubəyli is a village and municipality in the Imishli District of Azerbaijan. It has a population of 1,463.

Notable natives 

 Imamverdi Aliyev — National Hero of Azerbaijan.

References 

Populated places in Imishli District